Judah Creek is a stream in Audrain and Monroe County in the U.S. state of Missouri.

Judah Creek has the name of Wesley Judah, an early settler.

See also
List of rivers of Missouri

References

Rivers of Audrain County, Missouri
Rivers of Monroe County, Missouri
Rivers of Missouri